Benim Dünyam (My World) is a 2013 Turkish drama film directed by Uğur Yücel. It is the remake of the 2005 Indian film, Black which in turn was inspired by the true story of American political activist and lecturer Helen Keller, who was taught to read, write and speak, despite her condition as a deafblind.

Cast
 Beren Saat as Ela
 Uğur Yücel as Mahir Hoca
 Ayça Bingöl as Handan
 Melis Mutluç
 Turgay Kantürk as Refik

References

External links 

2013 films
Turkish drama films
Remakes of Indian films
Films about blind people
2013 drama films